José da Rocha Monteiro Silva, known as Zé da Rocha (born 29 January 1968) is a retired Cape Verdean football midfielder.

References

1968 births
Living people
Cape Verdean footballers
Académico de Viseu F.C. players
Gil Vicente F.C. players
Associação Académica de Coimbra – O.A.F. players
Rio Ave F.C. players
Leça F.C. players
C.D. Feirense players
Lusitânia F.C. players
Association football midfielders
Primeira Liga players
Cape Verde international footballers